Bill Blunden (3 December 1934 – 3 January 2018) was a British television and film editor.

Selected filmography
 Shalako (1968)
 A Touch of Love (1969)
 The Mind of Mr. Soames (1970)
 The Night Visitor (1971)
 Baffled! (1973)
 The House in Nightmare Park (1973)
 Ooh... You Are Awful (1974)
 The Bawdy Adventures of Tom Jones (1976)
 Warlords of Atlantis (1978)
 Hussy (1980)
 The Chain (1984)

References

External links
 

1934 births
2018 deaths
British film editors